Hyōbanki (評判記) were compilations of rankings and critiques of kabuki actors and courtesans published in Edo period Japan. They were generally published at the new year in Edo and Kamigata, reviewing and ranking the courtesans and actors of the previous year. Along with ukiyo-e woodblock prints and other publications, hyōbanki were important elements in the urban popular culture of the period.

Actor hyōbanki
A book called yarō hyōbanki was published in 1656, though many scholars consider the 1687 yakusha hyōbanki to be the first in the form. These were published regularly until 1890.

Actors were ranked according to a fairly simple scale:
Jō-jō-kichi (上々吉)　Upper-upper-excellent
Jō-jō (上々)	Upper-upper
Jō (上) Upper
Naka no jō-jō (中の上々) Upper-upper of the Middle
Naka no jō (中の上) Upper of the Middle
Naka (中) Middle

In print, variations were used to represent intermediate ranks between Jō-jō and Jō-jō-kichi. Sometimes only parts of the kanji (character) for "kichi" (吉) would be written in, each stroke towards completing the character representing an intermediate rank. Other times, strokes would be written in outline instead of ink-filled, to represent intermediate rankings not yet achieved.

At times, ranks above jō-jō-kichi were added, to describe and rank the greatest kabuki actors.
Dai-shigoku-jō-jō-kichi (大至極上々吉) Great exceedingly upper-upper-excellent
Kō-goku-jō-jō-kichi (高極上々吉) Higher very upper-upper-excellent
Shigoku-jō-jō-kichi (至極上々吉) Exceedingly upper-upper-excellent
Goku-jō-jō-kichi (極上々吉) Very upper-upper-excellent
Kō-jō-jō-kichi (高上々吉) Higher upper-upper-excellent
Dai-jō-jō-kichi (大上々吉) Great upper-upper-excellent
Shi-jō-jō-kichi (至上々吉) Climax of upper-upper-excellent

References
"Hyōbanki." Glossary H-J at Kabuki21.com. Retrieved 31 July 2007.
Lane, Richard (1978). "Images of the Floating World." Old Saybrook, CT: Konecky & Konecky.

Kabuki
Edo-period works